Jamie Robinson (born June 28, 1987) is a former Canadian football linebacker for the Toronto Argonauts of the Canadian Football League (CFL). He played college football at Florida State.

College career
Robinson played college football at Florida State University from 2005 to 2009. During his career he recorded 154 tackles, five interceptions, one sack and one touchdown.

Professional career
Robinson signed with the Toronto Argonauts of the Canadian Football League in May 2013.

References

External links
Toronto Argonauts bio 
Florida State Seminoles bio

1987 births
Living people
People from Rock Hill, South Carolina
Players of American football from South Carolina
American football cornerbacks
American football safeties
Canadian football linebackers
Canadian football defensive backs
Florida State Seminoles football players
Toronto Argonauts players